The Foreign Correspondents' Club of Myanmar (FCCM) is a members-only Foreign Correspondents' Club for the foreign media, business and diplomatic community based in Myanmar. FCCM was founded in 1989.

References

External links
Official website

Jour
Foreign correspondents' clubs